Valletta FC Futsal is a Maltese futsal club based in Valletta, Malta. They are the current domestic champions 2017/2018.

Valletta started their futsal league commitments in year 2012/2013 where the club ended up being relegated from premier to first division after losing 14 out of 18 matches.

In the following season 2013-2014, Valletta FC futsal revamped themselves, and the lions ended up snatching the title of First Division after winning 17 out of 18 matches.

In season 2014-2015, Valletta FC ended their league commitments in fourth place – progressed to the play-offs, however, they suffered a hefty aggregate defeat to Luxol in the semi-final of playoffs whilst also lost 10-2 to Balzan in the cup Semi-Final.

Season 15-16 was the best season so far with Valletta. Led by coach Clayton Felice, Valletta FC futsal won the title after beating Hamrun in the final match of the playoff final 4-1. However, in the same season Valletta FC lost to Luxol in the cup Quarter Final and lost to Luxol in the Super Cup 5-9.

In season 2016-2017, Valletta ended up the season in 2nd place however, lost the play-offs final against Luxol. During the same season, Valletta went on to lose also the cup final against Hamrun 6-8.

2017–18 squad

References

Futsal clubs in Malta
Futsal clubs established in 2012
2012 establishments in Malta